Vazha K'ach'arava (born January 2, 1937) is a Georgian former volleyball player who competed for the Soviet Union in the 1964 Summer Olympics.

He was born in Tbilisi.

In 1964 he was part of the Soviet team which won the gold medal in the Olympic tournament. He played seven matches.

External links
 
 

1937 births
Living people
Sportspeople from Tbilisi
Men's volleyball players from Georgia (country)
Soviet men's volleyball players
Olympic volleyball players of the Soviet Union
Volleyball players at the 1964 Summer Olympics
Olympic gold medalists for the Soviet Union
Olympic medalists in volleyball
Medalists at the 1964 Summer Olympics

Recipients of the Presidential Order of Excellence